Pteroini is a tribe of marine ray-finned fishes, one of two tribes in the subfamily Scorpaeninae.  This tribe includes the lionfishes, sawcheek scorpionfishes and turkeyfishes. The taxonomy of the scorpionfishes is in some flux; the 5th Edition of Fishes of the World treats this taxa as a tribe within the subfamily Scorpaeninae of the family Scorpaenidae within the order Scorpaeniformes, while other authorities treat it as a subfamily within a reduced family Scorpaenidae within the suborder Scorpaenoidei, or the superfamily Scorpaenoidea within the order Perciformes.

Genera 
The following genera are included in the tribe Pterioni, totalling 5 genera and 29 species:

References

Scorpaeninae
Pteroini
Taxa named by Johann Jakob Kaup
Venomous fish